The Department of Agriculture, Land Reform and Rural Development (DALRRD) is a department of the Government of South Africa created in June 2019 by the merger of the agriculture functions of the former Department of Agriculture, Forestry and Fisheries with the Department of Rural Development and Land Reform. The department has responsibility for agriculture, food safety, food security, land reform, topographic mapping, cadastral survey, the Deeds Offices, and spatial planning.

The political head of the department is the Minister of Department of Agriculture, Land Reform and Rural Development, who is assisted by two deputy ministers.  the minister is Thoko Didiza, the deputy minister for land reform is Mcebisi Skwatsha, and the deputy minister for rural development is Sdumo Dlamini.

In the 2020 budget the department received an appropriation of R16,810.1 million. In the 2019/19 financial year it had 7,505 employees.

Subordinate agencies
 Agricultural Research Council
 Deeds Registries
 Ingonyama Trust Board
 National Agricultural Marketing Council
 Ncera Farms
 Office of the Valuer-General
 Onderstepoort Biological Products
 Perishable Products Export Control Board

References

External links
 

Agriculture, Land Reform and Rural Development
Agricultural organisations based in South Africa
South Africa
South Africa
Rural development in Africa